Champagne is a 1928 British silent comedy film directed by Alfred Hitchcock and starring Betty Balfour, Gordon Harker and Jean Bradin. The screenplay was based on an original story by writer and critic Walter C. Mycroft. The film is about a young woman forced to get a job after her father tells her he has lost all his money.

Cast
 Betty Balfour – Betty
 Jean Bradin – The Boy
 Gordon Harker – Mark, Betty's Father
 Ferdinand von Alten – The Man (as Theo von Alten)
Supporting cast, all uncredited:
 Jack Trevor – The Officer
 Claude Hulbert – Club Guest
 Marcel Vibert – Maitre d'Hotel
 Hannah Jones – Club Servant
 Clifford Heatherley – The Manager
 Vivian Gibson
 Sunday Wilshin
 Phyllis Konstam
 Alexander D'Arcy
 Fanny Wright
 Gwen Mannering
 Balliol and Merton

Plot
Betty (Betty Balfour), an heiress, draws the ire of her father after using his aeroplane to fly to her boyfriend (Jean Bradin) who is on an ocean liner headed to France. Once reunited, they arrange to meet for dinner but Betty's boyfriend is unable to dine with her due to seasickness. When seated, Betty notices a man watching her, who then comes over to talk to her. Betty receives a telegram from her disapproving father who warns that her boyfriend is not going to be admired by her friends. To prove her father wrong she asks her boyfriend to marry her, but her boyfriend has grown to resent how controlling she is of their relationship. A quarrel ensues between them and the two part company when it's over.

The boyfriend regrets the fight and goes to Betty to apologise. He is surprised to find her adeptly playing a game of chess with the mysterious man. Another quarrel between the two is interrupted by the arrival of Betty's father (Gordon Harker). He tells Betty the family fortune, earned in the Champagne business, has been wiped out by a falling stock market. The boyfriend leaves after hearing the news of their fortune and the father sees this as proof the boyfriend is only after money.

In France, Betty decides to sell her jewellery but is robbed en route to the jewellers. Now penniless, Betty and her father move into a small, rundown apartment. Unbeknown to Betty, her father sneaks out to eat at an expensive restaurant after her cooking proves to be terrible. Once again Betty's boyfriend tries for a reconciliation but she rebukes him as she now thinks her father is right about him, and vows to get a job.

Betty finds work at an upmarket restaurant. The mysterious man shows up again and invites Betty to his table. She becomes uncomfortable with the stranger and is relieved when her boyfriend arrives on the scene. The mysterious man leaves after handing her a note that advises her to call him if she ever needs any help. The boyfriend openly disapproves of Betty's job. He leaves after a still-angry Betty dances wildly to provoke him.

The boyfriend soon returns with Betty's father. He is outraged at Betty's lowly job and confesses he lied about the loss of their fortune to teach her a lesson. Rather than being pleased, Betty is further angered by both her father and boyfriend. She turns to the mysterious man who offers to take her back to America. Betty gladly accepts but is later horrified to find she has been locked in her cabin. She imagines the worst about the mysterious man's intentions and is both relieved and delighted when her boyfriend arrives and releases her from the cabin. They soon reconcile.

The boyfriend hides in the bathroom when they hear the mysterious man approaching. He enters with her father who confesses he hired the man to follow and protect her. The boyfriend is furious and misunderstanding the situation, bursts from his hiding place to attack the man. Betty's father pacifies the boyfriend's anger by telling him he no longer disapproves of their wedding. The reunited couple start discussing the wedding, but soon start bickering over the arrangements.

Reception
Hitchcock's second comedy was this time poorly received, following the critical and commercial success of his first film in the genre, The Farmer's Wife. Although his expanding visual technique continued to draw recognition and praise, they were not enough to distract from the film's lack of an engaging plot. The "mysterious man" at the beginning of the film proved to be misleading, which aroused further displeasure from critics. Variety, although impressed with the technical aspects, was dismissive of the film. The reviewer felt "The story is of the weakest, an excuse for covering 7,000 feet of harmless celluloid with legs and close-ups". Hitchcock would later voice his unhappiness with the film in François Truffaut's book-length interview Hitchcock/Truffaut, when he said the film had no story to tell.

Preservation and home video status
A restoration of Champagne was completed in 2012 as part of the BFI's £2 million "Save the Hitchcock 9" project to restore all of the director's surviving silent films.

Like Hitchcock's other British films, all of which are copyrighted worldwide, Champagne has been heavily bootlegged on home video. Despite this, various licensed, restored releases have appeared on DVD, Blu-ray and video on demand from Optimum in the UK, Lionsgate and Kino Lorber in the US, and many others.

At the end of 2023, Champagne will enter the public domain in the United States but only in its non-restored, scoreless form. It will remain copyrighted in the rest of the world until the end of 2050.

References

External links

 
 Champagne at the British Film Institute's Screenonline
 Alfred Hitchcock Collectors’ Guide: Champagne at Brenton Film

1928 films
1928 comedy films
British comedy films
Films shot at British International Pictures Studios
Films based on British novels
Films directed by Alfred Hitchcock
British black-and-white films
British silent feature films
Seafaring films
1920s British films
Silent comedy films
Silent adventure films